Jef Andries (18 January 1919 – 26 September 2006) was a Belgian footballer. He played for Mechelen from 1936 until 1955.

Biography
Andries grew up in the hamlet of Elzestraat in Sint-Katelijne-Waver. In the 1940s he became one of the star players of FC Malinois, where he played on the right wing. With this team he became national champion in the 1942–43, 1945–46 and 1947–48 seasons. He was also selected four times for the Red Devils, without playing a single international match.

He died at the age of 87 in the hospital of Duffel.

Honours

Club
Mechelen
Belgian First Division A: 1942–43, 1945–46, 1947–48

References

1919 births
2006 deaths
Belgian footballers
K.V. Mechelen players
Belgian Pro League players
Association football forwards
People from Sint-Katelijne-Waver
Footballers from Antwerp Province